
The Avia BH-22 was a trainer aircraft built in Czechoslovakia in 1925, based on the BH-21 fighter. A smaller engine was used and armament removed. The lighter engine required the wing stagger to be decreased.  No significant modifications were made to the airframe structure, reduced weight further increasing the ultimate load factor (the BH-21 was designed to 12.5g). Some aeroplanes carried a camera gun. The type saw long service as a special aerobatic trainer and eventually several examples found their way into Czechoslovakia's aero clubs.

Specifications

See also

References

 
 
 Němeček, V. (1968). Československá letadla. Praha: Naše Vojsko.

1920s Czechoslovakian military trainer aircraft
BH-22
Biplanes
Single-engined tractor aircraft